The Bemidji State Beavers men's ice hockey team is a National Collegiate Athletic Association (NCAA) Division I college ice hockey program that represents Bemidji State University. The Beavers are a member of the Central Collegiate Hockey Association and play at Sanford Center in Bemidji, Minnesota, as of the 2010 season, after previously playing at the John S. Glas Field House.

History

Early history 
The Bemidji State men's ice hockey program began in 1946. From the inaugural 1946-47 season through the 1966-67 season BSU played as an independent member of Division I. In 1968 the team became a member of the National Association of Intercollegiate Athletics (NAIA). The program continued to operate as an independent member, now in the NAIA from 1968-69 through the 1979-80 season. For the 1980-81 season the program joined the Northern Collegiate Hockey Association (NCHA), in which Bemidji State is a charter member. BSU won the 1981–82 and 1982-83 NCHA regular season championships. Following the 1982-83 season BSU moved to NCAA Division II remaining in the NCHA. During the program's 16-season tenure in the NAIA the team won NAIA national ice hockey championships 9 times, including the first NAIA Championship in 1968.

The Beavers won their third straight NCHA regular season championship in 1983-84 and qualified for the NCAA tournament. In the 1984 tournament BSU won its first NCAA title at the Division II level with BSU sweeping Merrimack in a best-of-three series winning 6-3 and 8-1. Beginning in the following season, the Division II tournament was combined with the NCAA Division III level. The Beavers won the NCHA regular season championship for the third straight season and qualified for the school's first NCAA Division III ice hockey championship. BSU came in second after a 1-5 loss in the finals to RIT. Bemidji State won the first ever NCHA playoff tournament at the conclusion of the 1985-86 season and continued momentum into the NCAA DIII tournament winning the Division III Championship in an 8-5 win over Plattsburgh State. BSU made the NCAA Division III tournament three more times in the 1980s, 1987-1989 but finished fourth once and third twice. The Division II Ice Hockey Tournament was reinstated beginning in 1992-93 season and BSU won The Division II championship three straight years 1993-1995. In the 1996 championship the Beavers came up short to Alabama-Huntsville. The following season Alabama-Huntsville would get revenge, beating Bemidji State in the 1998 championship game. That would be the last year BSU participated in the DII tournament, the Beavers failed to qualify for the last NCAA DII Tournament in 1999 and the following season the Beavers moved to NCAA Division I level.

Recent history

CHA era 
Bemidji State joined two other former Division II ice hockey members Alabama–Huntsville and Findlay along with former DI independent teams Air Force, Army, and Niagara and expansion program Wayne State to form College Hockey America at the Division I level after the NCAA ended sponsorship of a Division II ice hockey tournament due to lack of membership. Ted Belisle joined the coaching team as an assistant, and BSU won their first CHA regular season championship in the 2003-04 season but lost 2004 CHA Championship and an automatic bid to the NCAA Tournament in overtime 3-4 to (#2) Niagara.

The 2004-05 marked a historic season for the BSU hockey program. The team swept through the CHA winning the CHA regular season championship and winning the 2005 CHA Championship over Alabama-Huntsville. The 3-0 shutout win gave the Beavers their first berth in the NCAA Division I Ice Hockey Tournament in program history. the team came close to a major upset, losing 3-4 in overtime to the #1 ranked Denver in the opening round. Bemidji beat Niagara 4-2 to win the 2006 CHA Championship and advance to the 2006 NCAA Division I Men's Ice Hockey Tournament for the second year in a row. BSU again lost in the opening round, this time to Wisconsin 0-4.

The 2008-09 season was the most successful season the team has had at the Division I level. The Beavers finished the regular season 1st in the CHA with a record of 12-5-1 and won the 2009 CHA Championship in 3-2 in overtime over Robert Morris. The team picked up the first NCAA Division I tournament win in the 2009 NCAA Division I Men's Ice Hockey Tournament with a 5-1 upset over Notre Dame Fighting Irish men's ice hockey, a #1 seed and ranked 2nd in the national rankings. The Beavers advanced for the first time in the Division I tournament and beat Cornell 4-1 to advance to the school's first ever Frozen Four held at the Verizon Center in Washington D.C. Bemidji faced Miami (Ohio) in the National Semifinal game with a 1-4 loss to the RedHawks.

WCHA era 
In addition to the on-ice success, in 2008 Bemidji began exploring options to strengthen the program. The CHA had lost many of the original member to programs at Findlay and Wayne State folding and other teams transferring to other college hockey conferences. Travel expenses to remaining members in Huntsville, Alabama, and Western New York and Pennsylvania was also a concern. BSU began looking at the Western Collegiate Hockey Association (WCHA) as a solution. In a first step the university signed a scheduling agreement against WCHA schools, many within a few hours drive to Bemidji, Minnesota. Other than the WCHA BSU's only option was to end the historic program. In 2009 it was announced the university and city of Bemidji would build a 4,000-5,000 seat state-of-the-art arena to meet WCHA requirements, that the 2,400-seat John S. Glas Field House did not meet. With the news of the Bemidji Regional Events Center BSU applied to join the Western Collegiate Hockey Association in early 2009. Bemidji State along with University of Nebraska-Omaha (transferring from the CCHA) was accepted into the WCHA as the 11th and 12th members. BSU officially became a member on July 1, 2010.

The Beavers opened WCHA play in the new Bemidji Regional Events Center on October 15, 2010 against North Dakota in a 2-5 loss. Bemidji picked up their first WCHA win at St. Cloud State 3-2 in overtime. Bemidji ended the regular season with a conference record of 8-15-5 as the 10th seed entering the 2011 WCHA Tournament. In the first round of the WCHA playoffs the Beaver beat 3rd-seeded Nebraska-Omaha two games to none with 4-3 and 4-2 wins. The series sweep sent Bemidji to its first ever WCHA Final Five and upset Minnesota–Duluth 3-2 in overtime, before losing to Denver 2-6 in the semifinal game.
With a WCHA Conference record of 20 wins, 6 losses, and 2 ties, The Bemidji State Beavers became WCHA Regular Season Champions at the conclusion of the 2016-2017 season.  They compiled 64 conference points, 10 more than runner-up Michigan Tech, and won the school's first coveted MacNaughton Cup.

CCHA era 
Bemidji State was one of the seven WCHA members that jointly announced in 2019 that they would leave that league after the 2020–21 season. These seven schools announced in early 2020 that they would reestablish the CCHA, and added an eighth member before starting play in the revived league in 2021.

Season-by-season results

All-time coaching records 
As of April 1, 2023

Awards

NCAA

Individual awards

Senior CLASS Award

 Brendan Harms (2017)

All-Americans
Second Team

 2009–10: Matt Read, F

CHA

Individual awards

Player of the Year
 Andrew Murray (2005)
 Matt Read (2010)

Rookie of the Year
 Riley Riddell (2002)
 Luke Erickson (2004)
 Matt Read (2008)
 Brad Hunt (2009)
 Jordan George (2010)

Student-Athlete of the Year
 Andrew Murray (2005)
 Kyle Hardwick (2010)

Coach of the Year
 Tom Serratore (2004, 2005, 2008, 2009, 2010)

Most Valuable Player in Tournament
 Matt Climie (2005)
 Jean-Guy Gervais (2006)
 Matt Read (2009)

All-CHA Teams
First Team

 1999–00: Stefan Bjork, D
 2001–02: Marty Goulet, F
 2002–03: Grady Hunt, G; Bryce Methven, D; Marty Goulet, F
 2003–04: Bryce Methven, D; Brendan Cook, F
 2004–05: Peter Jonsson, D; Andrew Murray, F
 2005–06: Andrew Martens, D; Luke Erickson, F
 2006–07: Matt Climie, G; Travis Wright, F
 2007–08: Cody Bostock, D
 2008–09: Brad Hunt, D; Matt Read, F
 2009–10: Dan Bakala, G; Brad Hunt, D; Matt Read, F

Second Team

 1999–00: Calvin Chartrand, F
 2000–01: Clay Simmons, D
 2001–02: Grady Hunt, G; Riley Riddell, F
 2003–04: Grady Hunt, G; Peter Jonsson, D; Riley Riddell, F
 2004–05: Brendan Cook, F
 2007–08: Matt Climie, G; Travis Wright, F
 2008–09: Matt Dalton, G; Cody Bostock, D; Tyler Scofield, F
 2009–10: Ian Lowe, F

Rookie Team

 1999–00: Bob Tallarico, G; Clay Simmons, D; Rico Faticci, D; Daryl Bat, F; Brad Johnson, F
 2000–01: Bryce Methven, D
 2001–02: Anders Olsson, D; Andrew Murray, F; Riley Riddell, F
 2003–04: Luke Erickson, F
 2004–05: Matt Climie, G
 2005–06: Cody Bostock, D; Tyler Scofield, F
 2006–07: Joey Moggach, F
 2007–08: Matt Read, F
 2008–09: Brad Hunt, D; Ben Kinne, F
 2009–10: Mathieu Dugas, G; Jake Areshenko, D; Jordan George, F

WCHA

Individual awards

Player of the Year
 Michael Bitzer (2017)

Defensive Player of the Year
 Elias Rosén (2021)

Rookie of the Year
 Michael Bitzer (2015)

Outstanding Student-Athlete of the Year
 Zach Driscoll (2021)

Goaltending Champion
 Michael Bitzer (2017)

Coach of the Year
 Tom Serratore (2017, 2020)

All-WCHA Teams
First Team

 2016–17: Michael Bitzer, G
 2019–20: Adam Brady, F
 2020–21: Elias Rosén, D

Second Team

 2014–15: Matt Prapavessis, D
 2016–17: Phillip Marinaccio, F
 2017–18: Michael Bitzer, G
 2018–19: Justin Baudry, D
 2019–20: Zach Driscoll, G; Tommy Muck, D

Third Team

 2013–14: Matt Prapavessis, D
 2014–15: Brendan Harms, F
 2016–17: Gerry Fitzgerald, F
 2019–20: Elias Rosén, D; Owen Sillinger, F
 2020–21: Zach Driscoll, G

Rookie Team

 2013–14: Ruslan Pedan, D
 2014–15: Michael Bitzer, G
 2016–17: Zach Whitecloud, F
 2018–19: Owen Sillinger, F
 2019–20: Elias Rosén, D
 2020–21: Lukas Sillinger, F

CCHA

Individual awards

All-Conference Teams
First Team All-CCHA

2021–22: Elias Rosén, D

Second Team All-CCHA

2021–22: Owen Sillinger, F

CCHA All-Rookie Team

2021–22: Mattias Sholl, G

Statistical Leaders

Career scoring leaders
GP = Games played; G = Goals; A = Assists; Pts = Points; PIM = Penalty minutes

Career goaltending leaders

GP = Games played; Min = Minutes played; GA = Goals against; SO = Shutouts; SV% = Save percentage; GAA = Goals against average

Minimum 1500 minutes

Statistics current through the start of the 2021-22 season.

Players

Roster
As of July 8, 2022.

Olympians
This is a list of Bemidji State alumni were a part of an Olympic team.

Beavers in the NHL
As of July 1, 2022.

WHA
One player was a member of the WHA.

See also
Bemidji State Beavers women's ice hockey

References

External links
Bemidji State Beavers men's ice hockey

 
Ice hockey teams in Minnesota